Lawton's Mill (also known as the Albro Mill) is a historic mill located on Ten Rod Road in Exeter, Rhode Island.  The mill property includes an 18th-century house, an early 19th-century wood-frame mill building, and a 19th-century barn with early 20th-century additions.  Also surviving from the period of the mill's activity are dams and waterways associated with it, including a dam and raceway extending several hundred feet north of the mill building.  The mill building, which was built c. 1820, is one of a very small number of mill buildings to survive from the period in Rhode Island.

The mill was added to the National Register of Historic Places on June 27, 1980.

See also
National Register of Historic Places listings in Washington County, Rhode Island

References

Industrial buildings and structures on the National Register of Historic Places in Rhode Island
Exeter, Rhode Island
Buildings and structures in Washington County, Rhode Island
National Register of Historic Places in Washington County, Rhode Island